Kamal Singh Narzary is a former Member of Assam Legislative Assembly from Bijni Vidhan Sabha Constituency of Chirang District located in the BTR Region of Assam . He served as the MLA of Bijni from 2006-2021. He is member of Bodoland People's Front Party.

References

Assam MLAs 2006–2011
Assam MLAs 2011–2016
Assam MLAs 2016–2021
People from Chirang district
Living people
Year of birth missing (living people)
Place of birth missing (living people)
Bodoland People's Front politicians